The 2016–17 Moldovan "B" Division was the 26th season of Moldovan football's third-tier league. A total of 29 teams competed in this division. The season began on 27 August 2016 and ended on 2 June 2017.

The league consisted of two regional groups, Nord (North) and Sud (South).

League table

North

Results

South

Results

References

External links
 Divizia B - Results, fixtures, tables and news - Soccerway

Moldovan Liga 2 seasons
3
Moldova 3